John (died after 1156) was a Hungarian Catholic prelate in the 12th century, who served as Bishop of Nyitra (today Nitra, Slovakia) around 1156.

John was elected as bishop sometime after 1134, when his last known predecessor Nicholas is mentioned. John's episcopate is mentioned by a single source, a charter of Martyrius, Archbishop of Esztergom from 1156. Accordingly, John was present during the consecration of the parish church of Baratka or Bratka in Bars County (laid near present-day Levice, Slovakia) with three altars.

References

Sources

 
 

12th-century Hungarian people
12th-century Roman Catholic bishops in Hungary
Bishops of Nitra